The 2012–13 McNeese State Cowboys basketball team represented McNeese State University during the 2012–13 NCAA Division I men's basketball season. The Cowboys, led by seventh year head coach Dave Simmons, played their home games at Burton Coliseum, with three home games at Sudduth Coliseum, and were members of the Southland Conference. They finished the season 14–17, 7–11 in Southland play to finish in a tie for seventh place. They lost in the quarterfinals of the Southland tournament to Southeastern Louisiana.

Roster

Schedule

|-
!colspan=9| Regular season

|-
!colspan=9| 2013 Southland Conference men's basketball tournament

References

McNeese Cowboys basketball seasons
McNeese State
McNeese State
McNeese State